Allaire is a commune in the Morbihan department in the Brittany region in northwestern France.

Geography
The river Arz forms most of the commune's northeastern border.

Population

Inhabitants of Allaire are called Allairiens.

See also
Communes of the Morbihan department
Allaire (surname)

References

External links

 

Mayors of Morbihan Association 

Communes of Morbihan